The 1856 Tasmanian colonial elections took place from 8 to 22 September 1856 (for the House of Assembly) and 6 to 17 October 1856 (for the Legislative Council). The elections were the first to be held under the Electoral Act 1856, which established responsible government in Tasmania (until 1 January 1856 called Van Diemen's Land) and created a bicameral parliament consisting of the 30-member Tasmanian House of Assembly and the 15-member Tasmanian Legislative Council.

Members were elected using first-past-the-post voting. Following the election, William Champ became the first Premier of Tasmania on 1 November 1856, but his government lasted only 117 days.

Results

House of Assembly
Elections for members of the House of Assembly took place between 8 and 22 September 1856. Members were elected from single-member 24 single-member divisions, while Hobart Town returned 5 members and Launceston returned 3 members. 16 members were elected unopposed, while the other members were elected using first-past-the-post voting.

See also
Members of the Tasmanian House of Assembly, 1856–1861

References

1856 elections in Australia
Elections in Tasmania
19th century in Tasmania
Colony of Tasmania